Whitehaven Amateur Football Club is a football club in Whitehaven, Cumbria.

History
The club was formed in 1994 from the ashes of Marchon A.F.C. and went on to win the Wearside League Division Two that season. After winning the Wearside League in the 2005–06 and coming second in 2006–07 they were finally promoted to the Northern League Division Two, their highest position in the National League System, following the 2007–08 season, after they finished third.

Other honours include the Monkwearmouth Charity Cup in the 2006–07 season and runners-up places in the Wearside League Cup (1994–95) and twice in the Shipowners Cup (2006–07 and 2007–08). In 2014 the club hosted Whitley Bay Football Club in the semi final of the Northern League League Cup, for a place in the final played at St James' Park of Newcastle United. Unfortunately, having taken the lead, Whitehaven were beaten 3–2 on the night.

The club has moved from football club to social enterprise and is now a company limited by guarantee.

Ground
A new ground for the club has been in the planning stages for some time, however it has been beset with problems. It was envisaged that a £6 million sports stadium (sharing with Whitehaven R.L.F.C.) would be designed with an 8,000-capacity, though it is believed the final price tag could be higher. This is now mothballed, and upgraded individual facilities will instead be installed, including new clubhouse.

The new facility, was hoped to be part of a sports village for the site, and was hoped that it would become a centrepiece of the £20 million Pow Beck regeneration, in which Copeland Council and West Lakes Renaissance are the most significant players.

Honours
Wearside League
Champions 2005–06
Runners-up 2006–07
Wearside League Division Two
Champions 1995–96

Records
FA Cup
Preliminary Round 2010–11, 2011–12, 2012–13, 2013–14
FA Vase
Second Qualifying Round 2009–10, 2010–11, 2011–12

References

External links
Official website

Football clubs in England
Football clubs in Cumbria
Association football clubs established in 1994
1994 establishments in England
Whitehaven
Wearside Football League
Northern Football League
West Lancashire Football League